The Teluk Pulai Komuter Station is a commuter train station operated by KTM Komuter and served by the Port Klang Line. This station is built to cater the traffic in Teluk Pulai a suburb in South Klang. The Klang Komuter Station, which also serves the same locality, is located 1 km away.

The Teluk Pulai Komuter Station is one of the earliest commuter station in Malaysia since commuter service is introduced in 1995. Teluk Pulai Station has undergone upgrades in 2020 to replace the old building built since 1995.

Station Facilities and Services
The following facilities and services are available at this station.
 Touch N Go Lane
 Ticket Counter
 Ticket Vending Machine
 Wheelchair Ramp

Nearby Landmarks and Attractions
 Hong Shan Si Temple (凤山寺)
A Taoism temple worshiping Nine Emperor Gods (九皇爷). Situated opposite commuter station. The Nine Emperor Gods Festival will be held from 1st to 9th September every year according to Lunar calendar. It is very crowded with worshipers.
 Teluk Pulai Local Night Market (Pasar Malam)
Situated at Jalan Teluk Pulai, 1 km away from commuter station. It operates every Friday and Sunday night.
 Famous Bak Kut Teh Restaurants
Well-known Bak Kut Teh restaurants such as Teluk Pulai Bak Kut Teh and Klang Lek Bak Kut Teh is just 5 minutes walking distance from the station.
 Tian Hock Kung Temple (天福宫)
Situated at Jalan Tepi Sungai. Famous for its snake theme temple architecture. Also known as Klang Snake Temple.
 Raja Muda Nala Bridge (Jambatan Raja Muda Nala)
Also known as Klang Third Bridge, connecting the northern and southern parts of Klang.
 Klinik Kesihatan Sungai Bertik
Government owned health center for residents staying in Teluk Pulai area.
Sree Selva Vinayagar Temple

Nearby Schools
Primary Schools
 Sekolah Jenis Kebangsaan (Cina) Chuen Min 循民华小 (0.4 km away)
 Sekolah Kebangsaan Teluk Pulai (1.1 km away)
 Sekolah Kebangsaan Taman Gembira (1.3 km away)
 Sekolah Kebangsaan (Lelaki) Methodist ACS (1.4 km away)
 Sekolah Rendah Agama Jalan Hassan (1.8 km away)
 Sekolah Kebangsaan Telok Gadong (2.1 km away)
 Sekolah Kebangsaan Sungai Udang (2.2 km away)

Secondary Schools
 Sekolah Menengah Kebangsaan Telok Gadong (0.6 km away)
 Sekolah Menengah Kebangsaan Methodist ACS (1.6 km away)
 Sekolah Menengah Kebangsaan Perempuan Methodist (1.9 km away)
 Sekolah Agama Menengah Sultan Hisamuddin (2.0 km away)

Nearby Charitable Organization
Some charitable organization nearby the commuter station:
 The National Autism Society of Malaysia (NASOM) Teluk Pulai Centre (0.4 km away)
 Great Heart Community Center (GHCC) (0.9 km away)
 Rumah Ozanam Klang (1.5 km away)

Nearby Neighborhood
There are a few reachable neighborhood from the commuter station:
 Taman Teluk Pulai
 Taman Melawis
 Taman Aneka Baru
 Taman Wangi
 Taman Teluk Pulai Indah
 Taman Kota Jaya
 Teluk Gadong
 Taman Emas
 Kampung Sungai Udang
 Kampung Delek Kanan

External links
Teluk Pulai KTM Station
KTMB train Schedule

References

Klang (city)
Port Klang Line
Railway stations in Selangor